Brodie Croft (born 14 July 1997) is an Australian professional rugby league footballer who plays as a  or  for the Salford Red Devils in the Super League.

He previously played for the Melbourne Storm and Brisbane Broncos in the NRL.

Early life
Croft was born in Dalby, Queensland, Australia. He was educated at St. Joseph's College, Toowoomba and later Anglican Church Grammar School, Brisbane.

He played his junior rugby league for the Highfields Eagles and was a member of the 2014 Churchie First XV alongside Kalyn Ponga, and Jaydn Su'a before being signed by the Melbourne Storm.

He played for the Toowoomba Clydesdales in the Cyril Connell Cup during 2013, before moving to Brisbane, to join the Eastern Suburbs Tigers in the Mal Meninga Cup. The following year, he was named 18th man for the Queensland under-18 rugby league team.

Playing career

2016–2019: Melbourne Storm
In 2016, Croft was named in the QAS under-20 squad and played for the Melbourne Storm's NYC team. On 22 May, he made his Queensland Cup debut with Melbourne's feeder team, the Easts Tigers, scoring a try in their 52-20 win over the Ipswich Jets.

In Round 15 of the 2016 season, he made his NRL debut for the Melbourne Storm against St. George Illawarra. On 13 July, he represented the Queensland under-20 rugby league team.

Croft started the 2017 season by playing in the NRL Auckland Nines. He scored 3 tries and was named in the team of the tournament. In just his second NRL game, he slotted an extra-time field goal to secure victory over North Queensland and in doing so, Melbourne escaped with a 23-22 win in golden-point. On 24 July, he signed a contract extension with the Storm, tying him to the club for at least another three years with a view to replacing Cooper Cronk in the long-term as Melbourne's halfback.  Croft was described by the media at the time as the next Cooper Cronk and was labelled a "Cooper Cronk clone". On 19 August, with Cronk rested, Croft scored a hat-trick and had two try assists in a 44-12 win over the Newcastle Knights in just his fifth NRL game. Despite this performance, he didn't feature in another NRL match for the remainder of the season due to the return of Cronk, leading the NRL side to the 2017 NRL Grand Final victory.

In February 2018, Croft staked his claim as Melbourne's new halfback. He scored a try and three try assists in a composed performance against Leeds in the 2018 World Club Challenge at AAMI Park. He played in the 2018 NRL Grand Final against the Sydney Roosters where Melbourne were beaten 21-6.

After playing the first 21 games of the 2019 season at halfback, Croft was surprisingly dropped from the Melbourne line-up entirely, only playing one more game in round 25 at five-eighth, and not making an appearance throughout the finals.  In order to remain under the salary cap for 2020, Melbourne elected to release Croft from his contract, officially doing so on 29 November.  That same day, he signed a three-year contract with the Brisbane Broncos.

Croft was part of the Junior Kangaroos squad which played against France on 25 October.  The match ended in a 62-4 Kangaroos victory.

2020–2021: Brisbane Broncos
Croft endured a difficult first year in Brisbane and played 14 games for the club as they finished last on the table and claimed the wooden spoon. 

In round 20 of the 2021 NRL season, Croft scored his first try of the season in a 37-18 thrashing of arch rivals North Queensland.  On 9 August, Croft signed a two-year deal to join English side Salford.

2022–present: Salford
On 9 August 2021, Salford Red Devils announced the signing of Brodie Croft from the Brisbane Broncos on a two-year deal. Upon signing for the club, Director of Rugby and Operations Ian Blease said "Brodie coming to the Red Devils is up there with any signing in recent times for this club. It has taken a long period of time to get this deal done but I am so pleased to get a player of Brodie's quality and class officially across the line. Brodie can come to the Red Devils and enjoy his rugby league again, he is still only a young halfback and after speaking with him over the last few weeks he has the determination to come to the club and push us on with our ambition, it will be tremendous to see him don the Red Devils shirt next season and beyond."

In Round 1 of the 2022 Super League season, Croft made his club debut for Salford in their 26-16 victory over Castleford.
Croft played almost every game for Salford in the 2022 Super League season and following a remarkable comeback win away to Warrington in July 2022, Crofts form prompted Salford head coach Paul Rowley to label Croft as the 'best half-back in Super League'. Croft guided Salford to play-off finish and was instrumental in securing the teams preliminary finals spot after a comprehensive victory away at Huddersfield. Due to a failed head injury assessment in the Huddersfield game, Croft missed the clubs semi-final defeat to St Helens RFC due to concussion protocols. Croft finished the regular season with 32 try contributions (25 assists and 7 trys). Croft made over 2,700 running metres with 83 tackle busts and 23 clean breaks. On 20 September 2022, Croft was named Man of Steel after being voted as the seasons best player.
In February 2023, Croft signed a seven-year deal to remain at Salford until the end of the 2030 Super League season.

Honours
Individual
 2016, 2017 Queensland under-20 rugby league team
 2022 Steve Prescott Man of Steel
Club
 2018 World Club Challenge Winners
 2018 NRL Grand Final Runner-up

References

External links
Brisbane Broncos profile
Melbourne Storm profile

1997 births
Living people
Australian rugby league players
Australian expatriate sportspeople in England
Combined Nationalities rugby league team players
Melbourne Storm players
Eastern Suburbs Tigers players
Rugby league halfbacks
Brisbane Broncos players
Salford Red Devils players
Rugby league players from Queensland